Classical mythology, Greco-Roman mythology, or Greek and Roman mythology is both the body of and the study of myths from the ancient Greeks and ancient Romans as they are used or transformed by cultural reception. Along with philosophy and political thought, mythology represents one of the major survivals of classical antiquity throughout later Western culture. The Greek word mythos refers to the spoken word or speech, but it also denotes a tale, story or narrative.

As late as the Roman conquest of Greece during the last two centuries Before the Common Era and for centuries afterwards, the Romans, who already had gods of their own, adopted much mythology directly from the Greeks while preserving their own Roman (Latin) names for the gods. In storytelling and literature, this thereby caused an equivalence between many Roman and Greek deities; some examples include between the Roman sky god Jupiter or Jove and the Greek counterpart Zeus; between the Roman fertility goddess Venus and the Greek Aphrodite; and between the Roman sea god Neptune and the Greek Poseidon. 

During the Middle Ages and Renaissance, when Latin, spread by the Roman Empire, remained the dominant language in Europe for international educated discourse, mythological names almost always appeared in Latinized form. With the Greek revival of the 19th century, however, Greek names began to be used more often, with both "Zeus" and "Jupiter" being widely used, for instance, as the name of the supreme god of the classical pantheon.

Classical myth

Classical mythology is a term often used to designate the myths belonging to the Greek and Roman traditions. The myths are believed to have been acquired first by oral tradition, entering since Homer and Hesiod the literate era; later works by those who studied or collected the myths, or sometimes all literary works relating to mythology, are known as mythography and those who wrote them as mythographers. A classical myth as it appears in later Western culture is usually a syncretism of various versions from both Greek and Latin sources.

Greek myths were narratives related to ancient Greek religion, often concerned with the actions of gods and other supernatural beings and of heroes who transcend human bounds.  Major sources for Greek myths include the Homeric epics, that is, the Iliad and the Odyssey, and the tragedies of Aeschylus, Sophocles, and Euripides. Known versions are mostly preserved in sophisticated literary works shaped by the artistry of individuals and by the conventions of genre, or in vase painting and other forms of visual art. In these forms, mythological narratives often serve purposes that are not primarily religious, such as entertainment and even comedy (The Frogs), or the exploration of social issues (Antigone).

Roman myths are traditional stories pertaining to ancient Rome's legendary origins, religious institutions, and moral models, with a focus on human actors and only occasional intervention from deities but a pervasive sense of divinely ordered destiny. Roman myths have a dynamic relation to Roman historiography, as in the early books of Livy's Ab urbe condita. The most famous Roman myth may be the birth of Romulus and Remus and the founding of the city, in which fratricide can be taken as expressing the long history of political division in the Roman Republic.

As late as the Hellenistic period of Greek influence and primarily through the Roman conquest of Greece, the Romans identified their own gods with those of the Greeks, keeping their own Roman names but adopting the Greek stories told about them (see interpretatio graeca) and importing other myths for which they had no counterpart. For instance, while the Greek god Ares and the Italic god Mars are both war deities, the role of each in his society and its religious practices differed often strikingly; but in literature and Roman art, the Romans reinterpreted stories about Ares under the name of Mars. The literary collection of Greco-Roman myths with the greatest influence on later Western culture was the Metamorphoses of the Augustan poet Ovid. 

Syncretized versions form the classical tradition of mythography, and by the time of the influential Renaissance mythographer Natalis Comes (16th century), few if any distinctions were made between Greek and Roman myths. The myths as they appear in popular culture of the 20th and 21st centuries often have only a tangential relation to the stories as told in ancient Greek and Latin literature.

The people living in the Renaissance era, who primarily studied the Christian teachings, Classical mythology found a way to be told from the freshly found ancient sources that authors and directors used for plays and stories for the retelling of these myths.

Professor John Th. Honti stated that "many myths of Graeco-Roman antiquity" show "a nucleus" that appear in "some later common European folk-tale".

Mythology was not the only borrowing that the Romans made from Greek culture. Rome took over and adapted many categories of Greek culture: philosophy, rhetoric, history, epic, tragedy and their forms of art. In these areas, and more, Rome took over and developed the Greek originals for their own needs. Some scholars argue that the reason for this “borrowing” is largely, among many other things, the chronology of the two cultures. Professor Elizabeth Vandiver says Greece was the first culture in the Mediterranean, then Rome second.

See also

Related topics
 Chariot clock
 Classical tradition
 Classics
 Greco-Roman world
 Greek mythology in western art and literature
 LGBT themes in classical mythology
 List of films based on classical mythology
 List of films based on Greek drama
 Matter of Rome
 Natale Conti, influential Renaissance mythographer
 Proto-Indo-European religion
 Vatican Mythographers

Classical mythology categories
 Classical mythology in popular culture
 Ancient Greece in art and culture
 Works based on classical mythology

On individual myths or figures
 Ares in popular culture
 Prometheus in popular culture

References

 

it:Mitologia classica